Dinnia Cecilia Díaz Artavia (born 14 January 1988) is a Costa Rican footballer who plays as a goalkeeper for Deportivo Saprissa and the Costa Rica women's national team.

References

External links
 
 Profile  at Fedefutbol
 

1988 births
Living people
Costa Rican women's footballers
Costa Rica women's international footballers
2015 FIFA Women's World Cup players
People from Guanacaste Province
Women's association football goalkeepers
Footballers at the 2015 Pan American Games
Competitors at the 2014 Central American and Caribbean Games
Central American Games gold medalists for Costa Rica
Central American Games medalists in football
Pan American Games competitors for Costa Rica